The Organisation of Bulgarian Scouts (Bulgarian), the primary national Scouting organization of Bulgaria, became a member of the World Organization of the Scout Movement in 1999; work towards World Association of Girl Guides and Girl Scouts membership recognition remains unclear. The coeducational Organisation of Bulgarian Scouts has 2,109 members as of 2011.

History

The Organization of Bulgarian Young Scouts was founded in 1923 from three first scouts in Varna, Sofia and Samokov. In the second half of 1924, ОБМР was recognized and admitted as a member of the World Bureau of Boy Scouts, based in London. In 1940, with a brief letter to the International Scout Office in London, the leaders of the ОБМР reported on their self-dissolution, forced by the Ministry of War, General Hristo Lukov.

Scouting was outlawed after the war as well, when communists controlled Bulgaria.

Rebirth 
Scouting resumed in 1989 when the Berlin Wall was taken down, but it did not meet WOSM requirements for membership until 1995. The negative legacy of the Communist youth organizations contributed to slow growth of the Scouting movement, as it left the Scouts ill-equipped and without experienced leadership or established programs.

The Organisation of Bulgarian Scouts was accepted into the World Organization of the Scout Movement on January 17, 1999 as its 151st member and given an official welcome to WOSM at the World Scout Conference in South Africa on July 25, 1999. There are 57 Scout groups spread through Bulgaria, including in 20 of the largest cities and towns, with a membership of approximately 2,000. Sea Scouts are present in the city of Silistra, located on the Danube River, and on the Black Sea. The organization is volunteer-run. The Organisation of Bulgarian Scouts is open to both males and females. Bulgarian Scouts are well-publicized in their country and active in community development, including participating in projects related to reforestation and the Bulgarian Red Cross. They have an annual national Jamboree.

Program
Cubs are 7 to 11 years of age
Scouts are 12 to 18
Rovers are 18 to 35

Ideals

Motto
Scouts—"Be Prepared"

Sea Scouts—"Love the Sea"

Scout Oath
I give my word of honor, that I will do my best:to do my duty to God and to the fatherland, to help others at all times and to obey the Scout Law.

Scout Law

A Scout is honest and trustworthyA Scout is loyal to God, the fatherland, society and his familyA Scout's duty is to be useful and to help othersA Scout is a friend to all and brother to every other ScoutA Scout is courteousA Scout is kind to animals and protects the environmentA Scout is respectful and obedientA Scout is cheerful and has spiritA Scout is thrifty and respects all propertyA Scout is clean in thought, word and deed

Emblem
The membership badge of Organisation of Bulgarian Scouts incorporates the Cyrillic letters О-Б-С (O-B-S).

References

Information derived from reports of Thomas N. Turba, International Representative of the Indianhead Council, Boy Scouts of America in Saint Paul, Minnesota, who led Scout contingents from Minnesota to Bulgaria in 1993 and 1995.

External links
 Official website of the Organization of the Bulgarian Scouts
 Official Forum @ Organization of the Bulgarian Scouts

Organizations based in Bulgaria
World Organization of the Scout Movement member organizations
Scouting in Bulgaria
Youth organizations established in 1995
1995 establishments in Bulgaria